Wild Fire is an album by jazz saxophonist Rusty Bryant recorded for the Prestige label in 1971.

Reception

The Allmusic site awarded the album 3 stars stating "More dependable, if rather predictable, early-'70s soul-jazz from Bryant".

Track listing
 "Wildfire" (Rusty Bryant) - 6:55  
 "It's Impossible" (Armando Manzanero, Sid Wayne) - 5:03  
 "Riders on the Storm" (Jim Morrison, Robby Krieger, Ray Manzarek, John Densmore) - 6:55  
 "The Alobamo Kid" (Rusty Bryant, Bill Mason) - 7:48  
 "If You Really Love Me" (Stevie Wonder, Syreeta Wright) - 5:55  
 "All That I've Got" (Billy Preston, Doris Troy) - 5:30

Personnel
Rusty Bryant - tenor saxophone
Bill Mason - organ
Jimmy Ponder - guitar (tracks 1-6)
Ernest Reed - guitar (track 1 only)
Idris Muhammad - drums
Buddy Caldwell - congas

Production
 Bob Porter - producer
 Rudy Van Gelder - engineer

References

Rusty Bryant albums
1971 albums
Prestige Records albums
Albums produced by Bob Porter (record producer)
Albums recorded at Van Gelder Studio